Phosphomannomutase 1 is an enzyme that in humans is encoded by the PMM1 gene.

Phosphomannomutase catalyzes the conversion between D-mannose 6-phosphate and D-mannose 1-phosphate which is a substrate for GDP-mannose synthesis. GDP-mannose is used for synthesis of dolichol-phosphate-mannose, which is essential for N-linked glycosylation and thus the secretion of several glycoproteins as well as for the synthesis of Glycosylphosphatidylinositol (GPI) anchored proteins.

This enzyme has been extracted from the venom of the wasp species Polistes major major.

References

Further reading